Lai River may refer to:

Pakistan
 Lai Nullah, also Lai River, flowing from the Margalla Hills through Rawalpindi

Papua New Guinea
 Lai River (Purari) is a tributary of the Purari River in Southern Highlands Province in the central highlands
 Lai River (Sepik) is a tributary of the Sepik River in Enga Province in the central highlands

Thailand
 Nam Mae Lai is a tributary of the Yom River and part of the Chao Phraya River basin

Vietnam
 Ba Lai River in the Mekong Delta region
 Lai Giang River, known as the Lai River, in central Vietnam by Bồng Sơn